North Ambersham was a tithing in the Chichester district of West Sussex, England.  Until 1844 North Ambersham was a detached part of Hampshire and was a tithing of the parish of Steep. Under the  British Parliamentary Acts 2 & 3 Wm. IV. cap. 64 and 7 & 8 Vict. cap. 61, it was annexed to Sussex. For ecclesiastical purposes this tithing was attached to Fernhurst.

Notes

Populated places in West Sussex